Patkovo was a medieval county (župa) of the Grand Principality of Serbia in modern-day southern Kosovo, encompassing the territories surrounding the cities of Gjakova and Prizren east of the White Drin (the region of Metohija).

See also 
List of regions of Serbia
Hvosno

Historical regions in Kosovo
Subdivisions of Serbia in the Middle Ages
Grand Principality of Serbia